A gatekeeper parent, in legal setting, is a parent who appoints themself the power to decide what relationship is acceptable between the other parent and the child(ren).  The term is broad and may include power dynamics within a marriage or may describe the behaviors of divorced or never married parents.

Characteristics
Most "gatekeeping" situations are studied with consenting married couples who are first-time parents. Parenting situation studies using divorced couples and out-of-wedlock parenting relationships that show very similar or identical behavioral characteristics as married couples with children are usually studied as Parental Interference, Parental Alienation, Maternal Alienation, and Abuse by Proxy.

A gatekeeper parent exhibits the following behaviors:

Criticizes the way other parent parents
Creates unbending or unrealistic standards in order for the other parent to spend time with the children
Demeans or undermines the other parent's efforts at being an authority figure in the child(ren's) lives
Controls all the organizing, delegating, planning, and scheduling in the home
Becomes reluctant to let go of some of the responsibility for caring for the family
Needs a great deal of validation of their identity as a parent, both from the other parent and from outside the marriage or parenting relationship
Believes in the traditional roles assigned to husbands and wives
Views the other parent as a helper and not an equal when it comes to household chores and child-care responsibilities
Asks the other parent for help, and then gives explicit directions on how to accomplish a task

Inside a marriage, the characteristics and symptoms of a gatekeeper may already be apparent, with one parent being relegated to second tier status and disenfranchised with regard to their parenting skills or their ability to practice and nurture their own set of skills. This lends itself to the dominant parent taking control of the household, and it causes severe resentment and sense of helplessness in the other parent's relationship with the children. In a post-divorce situation, the gatekeeping parent may limit contact between the other parent and the child(ren), abuse the child verbally and psychologically, or utilize derogatory remarks regarding the other parent, including threats in order to maintain control.

Related conditions
It is yet to be determined or even studied as to whether parental gatekeeping is a different syndrome from parental interference and parental alienation or if the latter two are simply a more severe form of gatekeeping exacerbated by a high-conflict breakdown of the relationship between the two parents. Parental gatekeeping, along with parental interference and parental alienation are not recognized by the American Psychological Association as diagnosable "syndromes". Many mental health professionals have agreed that such terms are merely an attempt to explain a child's resistance to visitation with the father.  High-conflict circumstances already visible in the marriage can lead to accusations of incompetence, neglect, or abuse of the children –usually by the mother against the father –once the relationship is being adjudicated in a divorce preceding. No current studies have been published to link the three syndromes and the American Psychological Association has not ruled or identified any of the three as recognized syndromes in any of its publications. Independent individual studies of all three are still in progress with findings to be published later.

See also
 Parental alienation
 Parental alienation syndrome

References

Allen, S. M., & Hawkins, A. J. (1999). Maternal gatekeeping: Mother’s beliefs and behavior that inhibit greater father involvement in family work. Journal of Marriage and Family, 61, 199-212.
Austin, W. G. (2005a, February). Considering the Process of Support for the Other Parent and Gatekeeping in Parenting Evaluations. Colorado IDC News: The Newsletter of the State of Colorado Interdisciplinary Committee, 7(1), 10-13.
Austin, W. G. (2005b). The child and family investigator’s evaluation for the relocation case. In R. M. Smith (Ed.), The role of the child and family investigator and the child’s legal representative in Colorado (pp. C9-1 – C9-28). Denver: Colorado Bar Association.
Austin, W. G. (2008). Relocation, research, and forensic evaluation: Part II: Research support for the relocation risk assessment model. Family Court Review, 46(2), 347-365.
Austin, W. G. (2011). Parental gatekeeping in custody disputes. American Journal of Family Law, 25(4), 148-153.
Austin, W. G. (2012).  Relocation, research, and child custody disputes. In K. Kuehnle &  L. Drozd (Eds.), Parenting plan evaluations: Applied research for the family court (540-559).  New York: Oxford University Press.
Austin, W. G., Pruett, M. K., Kirkpatrick, H. D., Flens, J. R., & Gould, J. W. (2012). Parental gatekeeping and child custody/child access evaluations: Part I: Conceptual framework, research, and application, manuscript submitted for publication.
Austin, W. G., Fieldstone, L., & Pruett, M. K. (2013). Bench book for assessing parental gatekeeping in parenting disputes: Understanding the dynamics of gate closing and opening for the best interests of children. Journal of Child Custody, 10(1), 1-16.
Ganong, L., Coleman, M., & McCalle, G. Gatekeeping after separation and divorce. In L. Drozd & K. Kuehnle (Eds.), Parenting plan evaluations: Applied research for the family court (pp. ). Oxford University Press.
Holmes, E. K., Dunn, K. C., Harper, J., Dyer, W. J., & Day, R. D. (2013). Mother knows best? Inhibitory maternal gatekeeping, psychological control, and the mother–adolescent relationship. Journal of adolescence, 36(1), 91-101.
Kelly, J. B., & Lamb, M. E. (2000). Using child development research to make appropriate custody and access decisions for young children. Family and Conciliation Courts Review, 38, 297-311.
Pruett, M. K., Arthur, L. A., & Ebling, R. (2007). The hand that rocks the cradle: Maternal gatekeeping after divorce. Pace Law Review, 27(4), 709-739.
Pruett, M. K., Williams, T. Y., Insabella, G., & Little, T. D. (2003). Family and legal indicators of child adjustment to divorce among families with young children. Journal of Family Psychology, 17, 169-180.
Puhlman, D. J. (2013). Developming And Testing A Comprehensive Measure Of Maternal Gatekeeping.
Sarah J.; Brown, Geoffrey L.; Cannon, Elizabeth A.; Mangelsdorf, Sarah C.; Sokolowski, Margaret Szewczyk Maternal gatekeeping, coparenting quality, and fathering behavior in families with infants.  Schoppe-Sullivan,  Journal of Family Psychology. Vol 22(3), Jun 2008, 389-398.
Stevenson, M. M., Fabricius, W. V., Cookston, J. T., Parke, R. D., Coltrane, S., Braver, S. L., & Saenz, D. S. (2013). Marital Problems, Maternal Gatekeeping Attitudes, and Father–Child Relationships in Adolescence.
Trinder, L. (2008). Maternal gate closing and gate opening in postdivorce families. Journal of Family Issues, 29(10), 1298-1324.

Parenting